Nothing is Straight in My House is the twelfth studio album released by The Saints.

Track listing 
All tracks composed by Chris Bailey; except where indicated
"Porno Movies" - 3:08
"A Madman Wrecked My Happy Home" - 2:32
"Nothing Is Straight In My House" - 4:32
"Digging a Hole" - 3:59
"I Couldn't Help Myself" - 4:38
"Paint The Town Electric" - 4:12
"Nylon Pirates" - 3:03
"Bang On" - 3:13
"Taking Tea With Aphrodite" (Bailey, Wijnberg) - 2:57
"Passing Strange" (Bailey, Willson-Piper) - 5:06
"Garden Dark"  - 7:19
"Where Is My Monkey?" (Bailey, Wilkinson) - 3:08
"Nothing Is Straight (Slight Return)" - 2:33

All Tracks:copyright
Lost Music/Mushroom Music, Except (9) published by Lost music/ Mushroom Music/ Sony atv, (10)and (12) Lost Music/Mushroom Music, Copyright control

Personnel

Chris Bailey - vocals, guitar
Marty Willson-Piper - guitar
Caspar Wijnberg - bass
Pete Wilkinson - drums

Nothing is Straight in My House
Nothing is Straight in My House